Hulah Lake is a man-made reservoir that was created by the United States Army Corps of Engineers damming the Caney River in northeastern Osage County, Oklahoma, within the Osage Indian Reservation. Hulah is an Osage word meaning "eagle”, and was the name of the farming community that was located in the valley before the construction of the dam. The primary purpose of the lake is flood control. It has become a popular recreation area.

The dam is gravity type with an earthen core on a rock foundation. Construction was completed in 1961. The dam was completed in February 1951.

The normal storage is 3116 acre-ft.

See also
Wah-Sha-She State Park

References

External links

Reservoirs in Oklahoma
Protected areas of Osage County, Oklahoma
Bodies of water of Osage County, Oklahoma